is the 15th single by Japanese idol girl group NMB48. It was released on August 3, 2016. It was number-one on the Oricon Weekly Singles Chart with 304,315 copies sold. It was also number-one on the Billboard Japan Hot 100.

The center position in the choreography for the title song is held by Miyuki Watanabe. The music video was shot in Thailand.

Track listings

Type-A

Type-B

Type-C

Type-D

Theater Edition

Charts

References

Further reading

External links 
  

2016 singles
2016 songs
Japanese-language songs
NMB48 songs
Songs with lyrics by Yasushi Akimoto
Oricon Weekly number-one singles
Billboard Japan Hot 100 number-one singles